Milenko Babić (born 9 February 1947) is a politician in Serbia. He served in the Assembly of Vojvodina from 2012 to 2016 as a member of the Socialist Party of Serbia.

Early life and career
Babić was born in the village of Vajska in Bač municipality, Autonomous Province of Vojvodina, in what was then the People's Republic of Serbia in the Federal People's Republic of Yugoslavia. He graduated from the University of Novi Sad Faculty of Medicine and specialized in occupational medicine.

Politician
Babić sought election to the National Assembly of Serbia in the 2003 parliamentary election, appearing in the eighth position on the electoral list of Economic Strength of Serbia and the Diaspora. The list did not cross the electoral threshold to win representation in the assembly.

He ran for mayor of Bač in the 2004 Serbian local elections as the candidate of the For the Revival of the Municipality of Bač alliance, which was led by the Socialist Party and also included Economic Strength of Serbia. He lost to Democratic Party candidate Tomislav Bogunović in the second round of voting. He later ran for the Vojvodina provincial assembly in the 2008 provincial election as the Socialist Party candidate in the Bač constituency and finished third.

He ran for the Vojvodina assembly again in the 2012 provincial election and was this time elected, defeating Bogunović in the second round. The Democratic Party and its allies won the election, and Babić served as a member of the opposition. He also appeared in the lead position on the Socialist Party's electoral list in the 2012 local elections and was elected when the list won five mandates. At the municipal level, the Socialists participated in a coalition government led by the Serbian Progressive Party.

Babić did not seek re-election at either the provincial or municipal level in 2016.

Electoral record

Assembly of Vojvodina

Municipality of Bač

References

1947 births
Living people
People from Bač, Serbia
Members of the Assembly of Vojvodina
Economic Strength of Serbia politicians
Socialist Party of Serbia politicians